Mycobacterium chubuense is a species of the phylum Actinomycetota (Gram-positive bacteria with high guanine and cytosine content, one of the dominant phyla of all bacteria), belonging to the genus Mycobacterium.

Type strain: strain 48013 (previously, strain 5517) = ATCC 27278 = CCUG 37670 = CIP 106810 = DSM 44219 = JCM 6374 = NCTC 10819.

References

Reference: TSUKAMURA (M.), MIZUNO (S.) and TSUKAMURA (S.): Numerical analysis of rapidly growing, scotochromogenic mycobacteria, including Mycobacterium obuense sp. nov., nom. rev., Mycobacterium rhodesiae sp. nov., nom. rev., Mycobacterium aichiense sp. nov., nom. rev., Mycobacterium chubuense sp. nov., nom. rev., and Mycobacterium tokaiense sp. nov., nom. rev. Int. J. Syst. Bacteriol., 1981, 31, 263–275.

External links
Type strain of Mycobacterium chubuense at BacDive -  the Bacterial Diversity Metadatabase

Acid-fast bacilli
chubuense
Bacteria described in 1981